Downfall: The Case Against Boeing is a 2022 American documentary film directed by Rory Kennedy. Interviewing relevant people and featuring archival footage, the film looks into the events throughout the history of the aircraft manufacturer company Boeing that led to the crashes of Lion Air Flight 610 and Ethiopian Airlines Flight 302, both involving the Boeing 737 MAX and occurring within a short time span, as well as its subsequent investigation. The film sides with interviewees in criticizing the capitalization of Boeing, noting that the urge to beat major competitor Airbus led to the neglect of component failures within the 737 MAX.

Downfall premiered in a virtual screening at the 2022 Sundance Film Festival on January 21, 2022, before being released on Netflix on February 18 as a Netflix Original Documentary. The film received wide critical acclaim for its comprehensiveness, narrative structure, and emotions, mostly aimed towards Kennedy and editor Don Kleszy. It also renewed public attention on the 737 MAX case, causing further criticism of Boeing, who had initially declined to participate in filming and rebuked the film after its release.

Summary
Its story examines the 2018 and 2019 Boeing 737 MAX incidents, where two airliners crashed killing a combined 346 people and how Boeing may have been more concerned with financial gain over the safety of their passengers.

Kennedy said about the 21st-century history of Boeing:

"There were many decades when Boeing did extraordinary things by focusing on excellence and safety and ingenuity. Those three virtues were seen as the key to profit. It could work, and beautifully. And then they were taken over by a group that decided Wall Street was the end-all, be-all. There needs to be a balance in play, so you have to elect representatives that hold the companies responsible for the public interest, rather than just lining their own pocketbooks."

Release and reception
The film was released on February 18, 2022, and has an 91% approval rating based on 32 reviews on the review aggregator site Rotten Tomatoes, with an average rating of 7.5/10. The site's critical consensus reads: "With impressive clarity, Downfall: The Case Against Boeing reveals corporate corruption that's enraging in its callousness and frightening in its scope."

7.42 million hours were viewed globally on Netflix between February 13, 2022 and February 20, 2022.

References

External links 
 
 
 Official trailer

2022 films
2022 documentary films
2020s English-language films
Boeing 737
Documentary films about aviation accidents or incidents
English-language Netflix original films
Films produced by Brian Grazer
Imagine Entertainment films
Netflix original documentary films